Vale Royal Abbey is a medieval abbey, and later a country house, located in Whitegate, between Northwich and Winsford in Cheshire, England. During its 278-year period of operation, it had at least 21 abbots (possibly 22).

The abbey was founded in 1270 by Prince Edward for monks of the austere Cistercian order. Edward intended the abbey to be on the grandest scale. However, financial difficulties meant that these ambitions could not be fulfilled and the final building was considerably smaller than planned. The project ran into problems in other ways. The abbey was frequently grossly mismanaged, relations with the local population were so poor as to regularly cause outbreaks of large-scale violence on a number of occasions, and internal discipline was frequently bad.

Notes

References

Bibliography
 
 
 

Country houses in Cheshire
English Cistercians
Abbots of Vale Royal Abbey